Applied Econometrics and International Development (AEID) is an international journal of economics published by the Euro-American Association of Economic Development Studies. The journal debuted in 2001 and by 2006 was amongst the Top 50 most downloaded journals from Research Papers in Economics (RePEc).  Nobel Prize winner Lawrence R. Klein is Honorary member of its  Advisory Board and has contributed as an author. The current editor is Maria-Carmen Guisan.

A sampling of the types of articles found in the journal include:

Economic growth and cycles: Cross-country models of education, industry and fertility and international comparisons
by Guisan, M.C. & Aguayo, E. & Exposito, P. (Vol.1-1, 2001)

The Impact of Foreign Banks on Market Concentration: The Case of India
by Sathye, M (Vol.2-2,2002)

Trade Openness And Economic Growth Can We Estimate The Precise Effect?
by Georgios Karras (Vol.3-1, 2003)

China and India: Two Asian Economic Giants, Two Different Systems
by Klein, L. R. (Vol.4-1, 2004)

Macroeconomic Modelling: Approaches and Experiences in Development Countries
by Valadkhani, A. (Vol.5-1, 2005)

Direct and Indirect Effects of Human Capital on World Development, 1960-2004
by Guisan,M.C. & Neira, I. (Vol.6-1, 2006)

AEID is a refereed journal indexed in Econ-Lit (USA), SCOPUS of Elsevier, Sosig, Intute (UK), WebEc (Finland), Econometriclinks (Rotterdam, Ne) DEST (Australia), ISOC-CINDOC (Spain), Latindex Selected Catalogue (UNAM, Mexico), Ideas-Repec, Social Science Research Network (SSRN) and other selected indexes of Economics research. It has reached high positions at Ideas.Repec on number of downloads and downloads per item.

References

External links 
 Euro-American Association of Economic Development Studies

Econometrics journals
Publications established in 2001
Development studies journals